Néjib Belkhodja (Arabic : نجيب بلخوجة) (born Tunis, 1933 - died May 8, 2007) was a Tunisian painter.  He was the brother-in-law of economist Ali Zouaoui; among his works were the designs for several Tunisian stamps.

Born to a father from the Tunisian bourgeoisie of Turkish origin, whose members were mainly specialized in the trade and industry of hats, and a Dutch mother, opera singer at the Opéra de Paris [1], he studied at the School of Fine Arts in Tunis.

He began exhibiting his artwork in 1956 and solo exhibits in Tunisia; the same year he received the Tunis City International Exhibition Award. He also continues his career in France and Morocco, he participated in many group exhibitions throughout the world including in Tunisia, the United Kingdom, France, Egypt, West Germany and the United States. He won the gold medal [What?] in Italy in 1964 and Egypt in 1968. Also in 1968, he won the National Award for the painting of the Cité internationale des arts in Paris. In 1991 he organized an exhibition in Tunis with the Iraqi painter Dia Azzawi.

Belkhodja is distinguished by a particular approach to the traditional architecture of the medina, where the success of his works and paintings that bear the mark of specificity and authenticity of the modern Tunisian art.

References

Société internationale de publications commerciales, culturelles et artistiques, 1966

Tunisian people of Turkish descent
People from Tunis
1933 births
2007 deaths
20th-century Tunisian painters
21st-century Tunisian painters
20th-century Tunisian male artists
21st-century Tunisian male artists